Desert Island is the 1980 debut album of German cross-cultural new-age band Cusco.  The album attained high popularity in the form of sales in Japan and Korea.

Track listing

References

1980 debut albums
Cusco (band) albums